Richard Johansson (18 June 1882 – 24 July 1952) was a Swedish figure skater. He won the silver medal in the men's singles competition at the 1908 London Olympics. He was part of the Swedish medal sweep there. He also skated in pairs with Gertrud Ström and won the bronze at the 1909 World Championships.

Results

Men's singles

Pairs
(with Ström)

References

1882 births
1952 deaths
Swedish male single skaters
Figure skaters at the 1908 Summer Olympics
Olympic silver medalists for Sweden
Olympic figure skaters of Sweden
Olympic medalists in figure skating
World Figure Skating Championships medalists
Medalists at the 1908 Summer Olympics
20th-century Swedish people